The Chagis were a medieval ruling clan in Andhra. They ruled the Natavadi and Vijayavati vishayas with capitals at Vijayawada, Gudimetta and  Vinukonda.

References

Telugu monarchs
Dynasties of India